Magadi Airport is an airport near Magadi, Kenya.

Location
Magadi Airport  is located in the Magadi Division of Kajiado County, in southern Kenya, near the town of Magadi on the eastern shores of Lake Magadi, close to the International border with the Republic of Tanzania.

The geographic coordinates of this airport are: 01° 56' 49.2360" S, 036° 16' 48.0072" E (Latitude:-01.9470100; Longitude:036.2800020).

Overview
Magadi Airport is a small civilian airport, serving the town of Magadi and the surrounding communities.

Airlines and destinations
At this time, there is no regular, scheduled airline service to Magadi Airport.

See also
 Kenya Airports Authority
 Kenya Civil Aviation Authority
 List of airports in Kenya

References

External links
 Location of Magadi Airport At Google Maps
   Website of Kenya Airports Authority
 

Airports in Kenya
Airports in Rift Valley Province
Kajiado County